The 1966 Uber Cup was the fourth edition of the Uber Cup, the women's badminton team competition. The tournament took place in the 1965-66 badminton season, 17 countries competed. 
Japan won its first title in the Uber Cup, after beating defending champions United States in the Challenge Round.

Teams
5 teams from 4 regions took part in the Inter-Zone ties. As defending champion, the United States skipped the Final Round and played directly in the Challenge Round.

Panamerican zone

Australasian zone

Asian zone

European zone

Knockout stages

Qualifying round

First round

Final round

Challenge round

References

tangkis.tripod.com

Uber Cup
Uber Cup
Thomas & Uber Cup